LAB Architecture Studio was a firm of architects and urban designers based in Melbourne, Australia with international offices in London and Shanghai.

Directors
Peter Davidson after graduating from Bachelor of Architecture in 1980 from the NSW Institute of Technology, Sydney, moved to London in 1981 where he became editorial assistant for the journal International Architect. Whilst running his own practice for ten years, Davidson was also teaching at various institutions, including the Architectural Association School of Architecture where he met fellow design director of LAB Donald Bates. Davidson suffered a severe stroke in 2010 and has no involvement with Lab Architecture Studio.

Donald Bates completed his bachelor's degree of Architecture in 1978 from the University of Houston, Texas and received his masters of Architecture in 1983 at the Cranbrook Academy of Art. Bates was the associate architect to Daniel Libeskind for the Berlin: city edge competition entry as well as the Berlin Museum extension Competition entry, now also known as the Jewish Museum Berlin. After business partner Peter Davidson suffered a severe stroke in 2010, Bates was accused of forgoing his partner's physical, emotional and financial well-being. Quoted in The Age, Nina Libeskind referred to Bates' "Cynical opportunism and expediency".   
In 2012 Bates was appointed chair of architectural design at the University of Melbourne.

Awards

International awards 
 Mipim AR Future Project Awards (2008) commended
 FX International Interior Design awards London (2003) Best Museum category
 Cityscape Architectural Review Awards (2007) Commercial Built + Community Future Categories - Shortlist
 Kenneth Brown Award Hawaii (2003) Commendation for Asia Pacific Architecture
 Urban Land Institute Award for Excellence: Asia Pacific USA (2005) Best Public Project
 The Chicago Athenaeum International Architecture Awards USA (2006)

Australian awards 
 RAIA National Award (2007) - International Architecture
 RAIA National Awards (2003)
Interior Architecture Award
Walter Burley Griffin Award for Urban Design
 RAIA Victorian Awards (2003)
Victorian Architecture Medal
Marion Mahony Griffin Award for Interior Architecture
Melbourne Prize (2003)
Joseph Reed Award for Urban Design
New Award Australia
 Interior Design Awards Australia (2003)
 Australian Institute of Landscape Architecture (2003) — Award for Design Excellence
 Dulux Interior Colour Award (2003)
 Public Domain Award (2003) For Sustainability
 Governor of Victoria Export Awards Commendee (2005)
 Property Council of Australia — Victorian Division Australia (2005) — State winner of 2005 and Best Public Building
 MBA National Building & Construction Awards (2006) — Export award under $25m
 Australian Stone Architectural Awards — Best Civic Project (2006)

Notable projects

Federation Square 
Completed in 2002, Federation Square is situated on a  corner site bound by Flinders and Swanston Streets in Melbourne, Australia. With a building footprint of 45,000 square metres the precinct incorporates commercial, civic and cultural programs. Along with a wide variety of restaurants, bars and cafes and retail spaces larger institutions represented include the Ian Potter Centre (NGV), the Australian Centre for the Moving Image (ACMI), Melbourne headquarters for SBS Television and the Melbourne Visitor Centre.

In 1997 an international design competition was launched by the Victorian Government with a focus of creating new civic space for Melbourne, connecting Flinders Street to the Yarra River and enhancing the cultural attributes of the city. Five designs were shortlisted from the 177 entries. The winning design of Bates Smart Architects and Lab Studio Architects was announced in July 1997. When the competition was won, Federation Square was their first building project.

The main plaza can accommodate up to 25000 people. The outdoor amphitheatre plays host to a variety of festivals and concerts as well as broadcasting cultural events such as the annual Tropfest and sporting events such as the AFL (Australian Football League) Grand Final.

Federation Square was met with widespread disapproval, the architects receiving hate mail from people who loathed the design.

Mixed-use and offices 

SOHO Shangdu
Beijing, China (2004–07)
Site area: 2.2ha
Gross floor area: 170,000m2
Type: commercial, residential + retail

Riyadh Business Center
Riyadh, Saudi Arabia (2005)
Site area: 3.9ha
Gross floor area: 87,000m2
Type: offices, hotel, retail

Tatweer Towers
Dubai (2006)
Site area: 7.6ha
Gross floor area: 1,500,000m2
Type: commercial offices, residential, hotel + retail

Zovie Towers
Tianjin, China (2007-)
Site area: 2.7ha
Gross floor area: 223,710m2
Type: commercial office, residential, retail, hotel + business club

Guardian Towers
Abu Dhabi (2007–09)
Site area: 0.7ha
Gross floor area: 50,000m2

Gallery

References 

Lab wins Federation Square competition - state government press release, 27/7/97
Lab secures major project in Beijing
Lab wins project in Riyadh on arcspace website
Lab Projects

External links 
Lab Architecture Studio website

Architecture firms of Australia
Architecture firms based in Victoria (Australia)